Mike Champion may refer to:

Mike Champion (baseball) (born 1955), Major League Baseball player
Mike Champion (basketball) (born 1964), American basketball player
Mike Champion (racing driver), New Zealand racing driver